
Gmina Czarny Dunajec is a rural gmina (administrative district) in Nowy Targ County, Lesser Poland Voivodeship, in southern Poland, on the Slovak border.

Villages
Gmina Czarny Dunajec contains the villages and settlements of Chochołów, Ciche, Czarny Dunajec, Czerwienne, Dział, Koniówka, Odrowąż, Piekielnik, Pieniążkowice, Podczerwone, Podszkle, Ratułów, Stare Bystre, Wróblówka and Załuczne.

Neighbouring gminas
Gmina Czarny Dunajec is bordered by the gminas of Biały Dunajec, Jabłonka, Kościelisko, Nowy Targ, Poronin, Raba Wyżna and Szaflary. It also borders Slovakia.

References

Czarny Dunajec
Nowy Targ County